Tony Rominger (born 27 March 1961 in Vejle, Denmark) is a Swiss former professional road racing cyclist who won the Vuelta a España in 1992, 1993 and 1994 and the Giro d'Italia in 1995.

He began cycling late, allegedly spurred by competition with his brother. Rominger's strengths were time-trialling, climbing and recuperation.

He was a rival to Miguel Indurain in the Tour de France and was placed second in 1993 and won the mountains classification. His three wins in the Vuelta were a record at the time. In 2005, Roberto Heras broke that record but two months later tested positive for the blood-boosting drug EPO and was disqualified. Heras' win has since been reinstated.

In 1994 Rominger broke the world hour record twice in a few days. He used Bordeaux velodrome to ride 53.832 km and then 55.291 km, although a track novice.

He retired in 1997 after breaking his collarbone at that year's Tour de France. He is the agent of Austrian racing cyclist Matthias Brändle.

Client of Dr Ferrari
For his attempt on the Hour Record in 1994, he was coached by Dr Michele Ferrari, who was at the trackside during the ride.

Career achievements

Major results

1984 
 6th Overall Grand Prix Guillaume Tell
1985 
 10th Grand Prix des Nations
1986
 5th Grand Prix des Nations
 8th Firenze–Pistoia
1987 
 1st Giro della Provincia di Reggio Calabria
 3rd Overall Tirreno–Adriatico
 3rd Overall Giro del Trentino
 3rd Milano–Torino
 5th Overall Tour Méditerranéen
 8th Coppa Placci
 9th Grand Prix des Nations
 9th Firenze–Pistoia
1988
 1st Giro dell'Emilia
 1st Firenze–Pistoia
 1st Stage 13 Giro d'Italia
 2nd Overall Tirreno–Adriatico
 2nd Overall Tour de Romandie
1st Prologue 
 2nd Overall Giro del Trentino
1st Stage 2 
 2nd Giro del Lazio
 3rd Züri-Metzgete
 5th Giro di Lombardia
 7th Overall Tour Méditerranéen
1st Stage 5 (ITT)
1989
 1st  Overall Tirreno–Adriatico
 1st  Overall Tour Méditerranéen
1st Stage 4b (ITT)
 1st Giro di Lombardia
 1st Firenze–Pistoia
 2nd UCI Road World Cup
 3rd Clásica de San Sebastián
 3rd Milano–Torino
 4th Giro dell'Emilia
 5th Overall Volta a Catalunya
 6th Overall Tour de Romandie
 7th Züri-Metzgete
1990
 1st  Overall Tirreno–Adriatico
1st Stage 2
 2nd Overall Tour Méditerranéen
1st Stage 4
 2nd Overall Setmana Catalana de Ciclisme
 3rd Grand Prix des Nations
 4th Overall Critérium du Dauphiné Libéré
1st Stage 3 
 4th Clásica de San Sebastián
 4th Tour du Haut Var
 4th Trofeo Baracchi
1991
 1st  Overall Paris–Nice
1st Stages 1 (TTT), 5 & 7 (ITT)
 1st  Overall Tour de Romandie
1st Stages 2 & 5b (ITT)
 1st Grand Prix des Nations (Trofeo Baracchi)
 1st Firenze–Pistoia
 2nd Overall Tour Méditerranéen
 2nd Milano–Torino
 3rd Overall Critérium du Dauphiné Libéré
1st Stage 8 (ITT)
 6th Grand Prix des Amériques
1992
 1st  Overall Vuelta a España
1st  Combination classification
1st Stages 19 (ITT) & 20
 1st  Overall Tour of the Basque Country
1st Stages 2 & 5b (ITT)
 1st Giro di Lombardia
 1st Firenze–Pistoia
 1st Subida al Naranco
 2nd UCI Road World Cup
 2nd Overall Paris–Nice
1st Prologue & Stage 5
 2nd Overall Volta a Catalunya
1st  Mountains classification 
1st Stage 6
 2nd Overall Vuelta Asturias
1st Stage 1a 
 2nd Overall Escalada a Montjuïc
1st Stage 1b (ITT)
 2nd Grand Prix des Nations
 3rd Milano–Torino
 4th Overall Tour of Galicia 
 4th Road race, UCI Road World Championships
 5th Liège–Bastogne–Liège
1993
 1st  Overall Vuelta a España
1st  Points classification
1st  Mountains classification
1st Stages 11, 14 & 19 
 1st  Overall Tour of the Basque Country
1st Stages 1, 4 & 5b (ITT)
 1st Subida a Urkiola
 1st Polynormande
 2nd Overall Tour de France
1st  Mountains classification
1st Stages 10, 11 & 19 (ITT)
 2nd Overall Critérium International
1st Stage 2 
 2nd Liège–Bastogne–Liège
 5th Telekom Grand Prix (with Olaf Ludwig)
 8th Overall Paris–Nice
1994
 Hour record: 55.291 km (5 Nov 1994)
 Hour record: 53.832 km (22 Oct 1994)
 1st  Overall Vuelta a España
1st Stages 1 (ITT), 6, 8 (ITT), 11, 14 & 20 (ITT)
 1st  Overall Tour of the Basque Country
1st Stages 3 & 5b (ITT)
 1st  Overall Paris–Nice
1st Stage 8b (ITT)
 1st  Overall Escalada a Montjuich
1st Stages 1a & 1b (ITT)
 1st Grand Prix Eddy Merckx
 1st Grand Prix des Nations
 1st Telekom Grand Prix (with Jens Lehmann)
 2nd Overall Critérium International
 3rd Overall Volta a la Comunitat Valenciana
 6th Liège–Bastogne–Liège
 6th Milano–Torino
1995
 1st  Overall Giro d'Italia
1st  Points classification
1st  Intergiro classification
1st Stages 2 (ITT), 4, 10 (ITT) & 17 (ITT)
 1st  Overall Tour de Romandie
1st Prologue, Stages 3 & 5b (ITT)
 1st Telekom Grand Prix (with Andrea Chiurato)
 1st Stage 3 Giro del Trentino
 3rd Overall Tour of the Basque Country
1st Stage 4 
 3rd Grand Prix Eddy Merckx
 8th Overall Tour de France
1996
 1st  Overall Vuelta a Burgos
1st Stages 2 & 4 (ITT)
 1st À travers Lausanne
 2nd Overall Critérium du Dauphiné Libéré
 UCI Road World Championships
3rd  Time trial 
9th Road race
 3rd Overall Vuelta a España
1st  Mountains classification
1st Stages 10 (ITT) & 21 (ITT)
 3rd Overall Tour DuPont 
 4th Overall Euskal Bizikleta 
 5th Overall Vuelta a Aragón 
 5th Overall Escalada a Montjuich
 5th Time trial, Olympic Games
 6th Subida al Naranco
 10th Overall Tour de France
1997 
 2nd Chrono des Herbiers
 3rd Overall Circuit de la Sarthe
 4th Time trial, UCI Road World Championships
 5th Subida al Naranco

General classification results timeline

References

External links
Palmarès

1961 births
Living people
Swiss male cyclists
Swiss Tour de France stage winners
Giro d'Italia winners
Vuelta a España winners
Swiss Vuelta a España stage winners
Cyclists at the 1996 Summer Olympics
Olympic cyclists of Switzerland
Swiss Giro d'Italia stage winners
People from Vejle Municipality
UCI Road World Rankings winners